Alexander Laing (13 June 1752 – 10 September 1823) was a Scottish architect who was mainly involved in house and castle design.

Life
He appears to be the son of Thomas Laing (d.1774), a knife- and tool-maker who lived near the Theatre on Edinburgh's Royal Mile.

Laing trained as a stonemason, and (as was typical in that age) was also styled "architect", and was based in Edinburgh; He is first listed in Williamson's Edinburgh Directory of 1774 as a "Mason" living at Theatre Row (on the south side of the Royal Mile near the now Museum of Childhood).

Laing married three times: first to Charlotte Polson in 1772, then to Margaret Turnbull in 1786, and finally to Beatrix Currie in 1789.

He had a son, Francis (1 May 1773 – 24 November 1861), with Charlotte. He also had a daughter, Jane, who married Captain Alexander Robertson in 1808.

In 1795, Laing purchased the James Adam-designed 7 York Place, the manse for the adjacent St George's Chapel in Edinburgh, where he lived until 1818.

He left York Place in 1818. He moved to 6 Gayfield Place (a house of his own design) at the top of Leith Walk and was still living there in 1823.

Laing died in Portobello in 1823, aged 71.

Known works
Laing's works include:

Archers Hall, Edinburgh (1776)
High School, Edinburgh (1777)
Retreat House, Abbey St Bathans (1778)
House for Sir James Hunter Blair, 1st Baronet and his new wife (1781)
Wings on Dalmahoy House (1785)
Bridge at Dalmahoy (1787)
Steeple, Town House, Inverness (1789)
Inverness Royal Academy (1790)
Dunnikier House (1791)
Two villas at Gayfield Square (1791/2) 6 Gayfield Sq and 6 Gayfield Pl
Remodelling of Brechin Castle (1795)
Over Rankeillor House, Fife (1795)
Remodelling of Darnaway Castle (1796 to 1802)
South Queensferry Harbour (1797)
House at 8 York Place, Edinburgh (1798)
Langton Church Gavinton (1798)
Royal Northern Infirmary, Inverness (1799)
Dysart Church (1802)
Remodelling of Invermay and estate buildings, Forteviot (1802)
Parish Church, Huntly, Aberdeenshire (1804)
Peterhead Parish Church (1804)
Drumsheugh House, Edinburgh (1808)
Extension to Dysart House (1808)
Manse at Dunfermline Abbey (1814)
Manse at Grange, Banffshire (1814)
Manse at Aberdour (1822)

References

External links
 Alexander Laing - ScottishArchitects.org.uk

1752 births
1823 deaths
Scottish architects
People from Portobello, Edinburgh
Architects from Edinburgh